Teppo may refer to:

Teppo (name), a Finnish male name, equivalent to Stephen
 Teppō (鉄砲, 'iron cannon', the Japanese word for guns, see Firearms of Japan